Trzcinica  is a village in Kępno County, Greater Poland Voivodeship, in west-central Poland. It is the seat of the gmina (administrative district) called Gmina Trzcinica.

References

Villages in Kępno County